The 1981–82 Missouri Tigers men's basketball team represented the University of Missouri as a member of the Big Eight Conference during the 1981–82 NCAA men's basketball season. Led by head coach Norm Stewart, the Tigers won the Big Eight regular season and tournament titles, reached the Sweet 16 of the NCAA tournament, and finished with an overall record of 27–4 (12–2 Big Eight).

Roster
Ricky Frazier, Jr.
Steve Stipanovich, Jr.
Jon Sundvold, Jr.
Head Coach: Norm Stewart

Schedule and results

 
|-
!colspan=9 style=| Regular season

|-
!colspan=9 style=| Big Eight Conference tournament

|-
!colspan=9 style=| NCAA tournament

Rankings

Awards
Ricky Frazier – Big Eight Player of the Year

References

Missouri
Missouri
Missouri Tigers men's basketball seasons
1981 in Missouri